Occupy Buffer Zone (OBZ) was a protest movement that began on October 15, 2011 by Greek Cypriot and Turkish Cypriot activists, in the Ledra/Lokmacı checkpoint, in Nicosia, Cyprus. The movement began with a weekly occupation of the checkpoint, which is located in the buffer zone that divides the island's territory and capital into the self-declared Turkish Republic of Northern Cyprus and the Republic of Cyprus since the Turkish invasion of Cyprus in 1974. On November 19 of 2011 the occupation of the buffer zone became permanent.

Influenced by the global Occupy Movement, Occupy Buffer Zone aimed to protest and publicise the problems of the global economic and political system, as well as to raise awareness of how "the Cyprus Problem is but one of the many symptoms of an unhealthy global system". The movement emphasised the connection between the development of the Cyprus problem and the economic and political interests associated with the international economic and political status quo.

Occupy Buffer Zone's general statement
The following text is the movement's general statement that was distributed to passers by in the buffer zone.

"This is an inclusive movement functioning within some principal umbrella concepts for which we initially united, these are:

-The reunification of Cyprus.

-To raise awareness of how the Cyprus Problem is but one of the many symptoms of an unhealthy global system.

It is important to elaborate on the intended inclusiveness of the last point.

We have occupied the space of the buffer zone to express with our presence our mutual desire for reunification and to stand in solidarity with the wave of unrest which has come as a response to the failings of the global systemic paradigm. We want to promote understanding of the local problem within this global context and in this way show how the Cyprus Problem is but one of the many symptoms of an unhealthy system. In this way, we have reclaimed the space of the buffer zone to create events (screenings, talks etc.) and media of these events, which relate to the system as a whole and its numerous and diverse consequences.
Opinions expressed in this manner are not necessarily of the entire group, only the umbrella points of reunification and solidarity with the global movement can be assumed to be."

Development
The movement began on 15 October 2011 with a weekly occupation of the buffer zone in Ledra/Lokmacı street in Nicosia. A group of about 20 Greek and Turkish Cypriot activists had gathered in Eleftheria Square in Nicosia as a response to the global call for a protest on the 15th of October. Through discussion they decided to move the occupation from the Eleftheria Square to the buffer zone located in the Ledra/Lokmacı street.
The buffer zone was occupied subsequently on the 22nd and the 29th of October and the 5th of November.
On the 19th of November activists set up tents and made camp in the buffer zone for the night. The decision was then taken that the occupation would become permanent.
On 1 January 2012 the activists further occupied the abandoned buildings that were located in the buffer zone. The buildings have been used by the movement for its cultural and political activities, such as hosting and developing various workshops and the movement's General Assemblies.
The United Nations Peacekeeping Force in Cyprus (UNFICYP) asked the activists to leave the buffer zone on 14 January 2012 claiming that the occupation did not meet United Nations' regulation for activities in the buffer zone, but it did not employ any forceful methods for the evacuation of the area.
After the Police raid on 6 April 2012, the movement's activities and organisation began to fade. By June 2012, the occupation of the buffer zone was essentially over.

Police raid
On 6 April 2012, a strong police force from the Republic of Cyprus gathered in the area occupied by the activists and raided the occupied buildings at around 10:15pm. The operation included the anti-terrorist department and the anti-drug department of the police force. Policemen, equipped with guns, helmets and batons smashed the door and entered the building. A sequence of screaming and sounds of smashing and breaking followed. The police reported that it made 28 arrests, including 11 minors and that it had confiscated 1 gram of cannabis.

The police was reported to have used excessive and unjustified violence in the operation. Eyewitnesses reported that the police repeatedly hit a 24-year-old woman, "causing a massive bump to her forehead, as well as multiple cuts and bruises". Reports were also made of sexual assault on a 19-year-old woman, the beating of two activists that were arrested in the building, and for unjustified violence on the crowd of activists and passers by that had gathered outside the building.

A demonstration against police brutality and the police raid was organised on 12 April by political student magazine Skapoula, whose members had been participating in the movement and were arrested by the police on  6 April.

Images

References

Further reading

Antonsich, Marco (2012) ‘OccupyBorderZone’: practices of borderline resistance in a space of exception.
Iliopoulou, Eirini  & Karathanasis, Pafsanias (2012) From a Buffer Zone to a common space: The Right to the city in a landscape of conflict. Presentation at the International Conference of the Home for Cooperation, Nicosia Buffer Zone.

External links
 Official Occupy Buffer Zone Website (Archived)
 Buffer Zone, Documentary about Occupy Buffer Zone.

Protests
Occupy movement
2010s in Cypriot politics